Sung-hoon, also spelled Seong-hoon, is a Korean masculine given name. It was the fifth-most popular name for baby boys in South Korea in 1970, falling to sixth place in 1980. Its meaning differs based on the hanja used to write each syllable of the name. There are 27 hanja with the reading "sung" and 12 hanja with the reading "hoon" on the South Korean government's official list of hanja which may be registered for use in given names. One common pair of hanja used to write this name can also be read as a Japanese name Yoshihiro.
People with this name include:

Entertainers and musicians
Kim Seong-hun (filmmaker) (born 1971), South Korean director
Kim Sung-hoon (director) (born 1974), South Korean director
Kim Sung-hoon (born 1978), South Korean pianist
Kim Sung-hoon, stage name Ha Jung-woo (born 1979), South Korean actor
Kang Sung-hoon (singer) (born 1980), South Korean singer, lead vocalist of Sechs Kies
Sung Hoon, birth name Bang Sung-hoon (born 1983), South Korean actor
Sung Hoon (singer), South Korean singer, member of Brown Eyed Soul
Park Sung-hoon (born 2002), South Korean singer, member of Enhypen
Park Sung-hoon (born 1985), South Korean actor

Footballers
Jung Sung-hoon (born 1968), South Korean youth manager and former defender
Jeong Shung-hoon (born 1979), South Korean striker (Korea National League)
An Sung-hun (born 1982), South Korean midfielder (K League)

Other sportspeople
Choo Sung-hoon (born 1975), later known as Yoshihiro Akiyama, Japanese mixed martial artist of Korean descent
Jeong Seong-hoon (born 1980), South Korean baseball player
Yoon Sung-hoon (born 1983), South Korean field hockey player
Kang Sung-hoon (golfer) (born 1987), South Korean golfer
Choi Sung-hoon (born 1989), South Korean baseball player
Park Sung-hoon (figure skater) (born 2002), South Korean figure skater and singer, member of Enhypen
Lee Sung-hun, South Korean judoka

See also
List of Korean given names

References

Korean masculine given names